Spruce Run is an unincorporated community located along County Route 628 (Hill Road) and Spruce Run Road within Lebanon Township in Hunterdon County, New Jersey.

History
A school house was built here in 1766. Subsequent ones were built in 1825 and 1874. In 1800, the Lutheran and Reformed congregations built a union church. The current Spruce Run Evangelical Lutheran Zion Church was built in 1870.

References

External links
 

Lebanon Township, New Jersey
Unincorporated communities in Hunterdon County, New Jersey
Unincorporated communities in New Jersey